Gaétan Gervais,  (August 10, 1944 – October 20, 2018) was a Canadian author, historian and university professor, most noted as a prominent figure in Franco-Ontarian culture. With a group of university students at Laurentian University, he designed the Franco-Ontarian flag, and was a founding member of the Franco-Ontarian Institute.

Biography
Born in 1944 in Sudbury, Ontario, Gervais graduated from Laurentian University in 1965. He also obtained a master's degree and a doctorate from the University of Ottawa in 1968 and 1979. From 1972, he was a professor at Laurentian University.

Publications
2010 – Avec Jean-Pierre Pichette (dir.), Dictionnaire des écrits de l'Ontario français : 1613–1993, Ottawa, Presses de l'Université d'Ottawa, 1097 p.
2003 – Des gens de résolution : le passage du Canada français à l'Ontario français, Sudbury (Ontario), Éditions Prise de parole, 230 p.
2000 – Les jumelles Dionne et l'Ontario français, 1934–1944, Sudbury (Ontario), Éditions Prise de parole, 246 p., Prix Christine-Dumitriu-Van-Saanen
1985 – Bibliographie : histoire du nord-est de l'Ontario / Bibliography : history of North-Eastern Ontario, Sudbury (Ontario), Société historique du Nouvel-Ontario, 112 p.

Awards and recognition
2013 – Member of the Order of Canada
2012 – A high school in Oakville, Ontario is named after him as Gaétan-Gervais Secondary School.
2005 – Award of Merit Horace-Viau
1994 – Franco-Ontarian Order of Merit by the Association canadienne-française de l'Ontario, ACFO (now Ontario Francophonie Assembly, AFO)

References

External links
Work and publications at Laurentian University (pre-2004)
Work and publications at Laurentian University (post-2004)

1944 births
2018 deaths
Members of the Order of Canada
American people of Canadian descent
American people of French-Canadian descent
Franco-Ontarian people
Writers from Greater Sudbury
University of Ottawa alumni
20th-century Canadian non-fiction writers
21st-century Canadian non-fiction writers
Canadian non-fiction writers in French
Laurentian University alumni
Academic staff of Laurentian University
Canadian designers
Flag designers